D A V Public School, Tanda  is located on the Saury River in the town of Tanda, in Uttar Pradesh province, India.

Description
The school is a 10+2 co-educational institute providing education in a science 7 commerce stream. It represents and particularly supports the education of children from minority communities in the Ambedkar Nagar District of Uttar Pradesh. 

The DAV Public School is directly managed by the DAV College Management Society, New Delhi. The school was established in 1992 with the cooperation of Tanda Thermal Power project.

The DAV Public School in Tanda has launched a school website.

References

External links

"D A V Public School  Uttar Pradesh". www.icbse.com. Retrieved 11 November 2016.

High schools and secondary schools in Uttar Pradesh
Education in Ambedkar Nagar district
Educational institutions established in 1886
1886 establishments in British India